University of Kerala, formerly the University of Travancore, is a state-run public university located in Thiruvananthapuram, the state capital of Kerala, India. It was established in 1937 by a promulgation of the Maharajah of Travancore, Chithira Thirunal Balarama Varma who was also the first Chancellor of the university. C. P. Ramaswamy Iyer, the then Diwan (Prime Minister) of the State was the first Vice-Chancellor. It was the first university in Kerala, and among the first in the country. Accredited by NAAC with highest grade of A++ and scored 3.67 points out of 4.

The university has over 150 affiliated colleges and has sixteen faculties and 43 Departments of teaching and research. The Governor of Kerala serves as the Chancellor of university.

History

It was established in 1937 by a promulgation of the Maharajah of Travancore, Chithira Thirunal Balarama Varma who was also the first Chancellor of the university. C. P. Ramaswamy Iyer, the then Diwan (Prime Minister) of the State was the first Vice-Chancellor. It was the first university in Kerala.

Organisation and administration

Governance
The Chancellor, the Pro-Chancellor, the Vice- Chancellor, the Pro-Vice-Chancellor, and the members of the Senate, the Syndicate and the Academic Council constitutes the governing body of the university. The Governor of Kerala is the Chancellor of the university while Education Minister of Kerala is the Pro-Chancellor of the university.

Affiliated colleges

Rankings 

University of Kerala was ranked 1001+ in the world by the Times Higher Education World University Rankings of 2020. It was ranked 42nd in India overall by the National Institutional Ranking Framework (NIRF) in 2020 and 23rd among universities.

Notable alumni

Notable alumni includes tenth President of India K. R. Narayanan, geneticist M. S. Swaminathan, ISRO former Chairman G. Madhavan Nair, INSA scientist Perdur Radhakantha Adiga, former Supreme Court judges, Justice Kurian Joseph, Justice Fathima Beevi, legal luminary N. R. Madhava Menon, Indian film actor Mohanlal, Malayalam poets O. N. V. Kurup, Sugathakumari, Music composer G. Devarajan, historian M. G. S. Narayanan, cricketer Sanju Samson and many other eminent personalities.

Others 
Ambalapuzha Gopakumar
Mammootty
Jacob Abraham
S. Suresh Babu
M. A. Baby
T. V. Rajan Babu
Veliyam Bharghavan
Tiffany Brar
Sathyabhama Das Biju
G. Devarajan
C. Divakaran
Renji Panicker
Sanal Edamaruku
Salim Gangadharan
P. K. Gurudasan
Thirunalloor Karunakaran
O. Madhavan
V. Madhusoodanan Nair
Lopamudra R
S. K. Satheesh
T. N. Seema
Bindu Ammini
S. D. Shibulal
M. S. Valiathan
Mary Verghese
D. Vinayachandran
Rajashree Warrier
Jagathy Sreekumar
Jagadeesh

See also
 Chithira Thirunal Balarama Varma
 University College of Engineering, Kariavattom

References

External links 

Colleges under Kerala University

 
University of Kerala
Universities in Thiruvananthapuram
Educational institutions established in 1937
Public universities in India
1937 establishments in India